San Miguel is a primarily middle-class residential area of the City of Manila, and is one of the city's sixteen traditional districts.

Background 
Much of San Miguel is located on a riverine island, separated by the mainland by the Estero de (Stream of) San Miguel, and by the Pasig River. In order to reach the district, one has to cross any of the following bridges traversing Estero de San Miguel, from west to east: Carlos Palanca Bridge, P. Casal Bridge, Nepomunceno Bridge, Arlegui Bridge, San Rafael Bridge, Chino Roces Bridge (carrying Mendiola Street), Concepcion Aguila Bridge and J.P. Laurel Bridge. P. Casal Bridge's logical extension is the Ayala Bridge, that connects it to the southern bank of the Pasig.

On the district's eastern parts is another riverine island, bounded by the Estero de San Miguel and Estero de Sampaloc. A small part is on the mainland, at the far eastern corner.

San Miguel also includes the Isla de Convalecencia, the largest island in the Pasig River, which is home to the Hospício de San José, Manila's oldest Catholic welfare institution.

Malacañang Palace, the official residence of the President of the Philippines, is located in the neighborhood, and outside the Palace gates is Mendiola Street, a popular site for protests against the government.

The San Miguel district is also home to some colleges and universities that form part of Manila's "University Belt" which encompasses San Miguel, and the districts of Quiapo and Sampaloc. Educational institutions that are located in the district include Far Eastern University, San Beda University, Centro Escolar University, College of the Holy Spirit, Saint Jude Catholic School, La Consolacion College Manila and Victorino Mapa High School.

San Miguel is also the place where San Miguel Beer was originally produced, beginning in the Spanish colonial era. The brewery's buildings were demolished after the property was transferred to the Philippine government, and it today forms part of the Palace complex.

Barangays 

Barangays of San Miguel

Barangays 637, 638, 639, and 640 are part of Zone 65; Barangays 641, 642, 643, and 644 are part of Zone 66; and Barangays 645, 646, 647, and 648 are part of Zone 67.

Attractions

Casa Roces
Casa Roces is a 1930s ancestral house of the Roces family which was renovated and turned into a full-service restaurant, café and an art gallery. Casa Roces is located in the district of San Miguel, Manila right across Malacañan Palace, the official residence of the President of the Republic of the Philippines. The ground floor of Casa Roces features a coffeehouse with an outdoor wooden deck, a dessert bar, and a memorabilia and accessories shop. A bar also serves cocktails, wine, beer and liquor for evening patrons. On the second floor are a bistro, an art and family heritage gallery as well as private rooms decorated with a mix of Commonwealth elegance and modern flair. The second floor of the house was turned into a multi-purpose dining venue and an art gallery.

Casa Roces was designed in the Pre-war modernist style with Art Deco articulation using a variety of construction materials which includes reinforced concrete, wood and masonry. On the ground floor, the distinguishing feature is the use of "Machuca" tile flooring which is typical with Commonwealth era house. The original layout of the rooms were changed to accommodate its new use as a restaurant and an art gallery.

Notable people
 Angelo Reyes
 Imelda Marcos

References 

 
Districts of Manila